The Ḥarrat al-Shām, also known as the Black Desert, is a region of rocky, basaltic desert straddling southern Syria and the northern Arabian Peninsula. Vegetation is characteristically open acacia shrubland with patches of juniper at higher altitudes

The Harrat has been occupied by humans since at least the Late Epipalaeolithic period. One of the earliest known sites is Shubayqa 1 (occupied ), where archaeologists have discovered the remains of the oldest known bread.

Geology

The Harrat comprises volcanic fields formed by tectonic activity from the Oligocene through to the Quaternary period. It is the largest of several volcanic fields on the Arabian Plate, containing more than 800 volcanic cones and around 140 dikes. Activity began during the Miocene; a younger eruptive stage, at the SE end of the volcanic field, occurred during the late-Pleistocene and Holocene. It is known to have erupted in historic times.

The Jabal al-Druze, al-Safa and Dirat al-Tulul volcanic fields, among others, form the northern and Syrian part of the harrat. It is in the Tabuk Region of northwest Saudi Arabia. and is one of a series of Quaternary volcanic fields paralleling the Red Sea coast.

Archaeological sites
Desert kites

Jordan
Jawa, Early Bronze Age proto-urban settlement
Qasr Azraq and Qasr 'Ain es-Sil, ancient fortified sites in the Azraq Oasis
Qasr Burqu', ancient "desert castle"
Qasr Usaykhim, ancient fort northeast of Azraq
Shubayqa 1, Stone Age (Natufian) hunter-gatherer site with oldest bread-making find in the world

See also
Badia region
Hauran, historical region partially overlapping with Harrat al-Sham
List of volcanoes in Saudi Arabia
Sarat Mountains
Midian Mountains

Notes

References

Further reading

 Ilani, S., Harlavan, Y., Tarawneh, K., Rabba, I., Weinberger, R., Khalil, I., and Peltz, S. (2001), "New K-Ar ages of basalts from the Harrat Ash Shaam volcanic field in Jordan: Implications for the span and duration of the upper-mantle upwelling beneath the western Arabian plate" Geology 29(2):171–174
 Kempe, S. and Al-Malabeh, A. (2005), "Newly discovered lava tunnels of the Al-Shaam plateau basalts", Geophysical Research Abstracts 7, European Geosciences Union 
 Salf, S.I. (1988), "Field and petrographic characteristics of Cenozoic basaltic rocks, Northwestern Saudi Arabia" Journal of African Earth Sciences, 7(5):805–809
 Weinstein, Y., Navon, O., Altherr, R., and Stein, M., (2006) "The role of lithospheric mantle heterogeneity in the generation of Plio-Pleistocene alkali basalt suites from NW Harrat Ash Shaam (Israel)", Journal of Petrology 47(5):1017–1050
 Al Kwatli, M.A., Gillot, P.Y., Zeyen, H., Hildenbrand, A., and Al Gharib, I., 2012. Volcano-tectonic evolution of the northern part of the Arabian plate in the light of new K-Ar ages and remote sensing: Harrat Ash Shaam volcanic province (Syria). Tectonophysics, 580, 192–207.

External links

 
 
 VolcanoWorld information and aerial photograph

Volcanic fields
Volcanoes of Saudi Arabia
Volcanoes of Jordan
Volcanoes of Syria
Midian